Wollenberg may refer to:

Albert Charles Wollenberg (1900-1981), American judge
Wollenberg (hill), in Hesse, Germany
Wollenberg Grain and Seed Elevator, in Buffalo, New York